Alfred S. Julien was an American trial lawyer.

Biography
Julien attended Brooklyn Law School and graduated with honors.

In 1931, he co-founded Julien & Schlesinger along with Stuart Schlesinger.

In 1972, he represented Ron Galella against Jacqueline Kennedy in a notable law suit. He also represented Galella in another lawsuit against Marlon Brando which was settled out of the court.

Julien also served as a president New York State and Metropolitan Trial Lawyers Associations.

Julien was one of the first attorneys profiled in the book “On Trial:  Masters of the Courtroom” by Norman Sheresky  He was often quoted by the press in stories written about his cases and considered by his peers as among America’s best trial attorneys.

After Honorary Sybil Hart Kooper, a lawyer and member of the board of directors of the American Academy of Trial Lawyers and co-chairman of the women's rights committee of the Brooklyn Women's Bar Association, was denied membership to the Metropolitan Trial Lawyers Association, of which Alfred S. Julien was president and to which he had proposed her for membership, Julien wrote to Kooper saying he was "not at all proud" and "I mean to break the barrier if I can.  It deserves to be broken.  I suggest you bear with me".

Awards 
1992 Hall of Fame Inductee, American Association for Justice.

Death 
In 1989, he died due to a heart attack in Scarsdale, New York.

Books
 Julien on Summation
 Opening Statements

References

1989 deaths
American lawyers